The White Tower is a 1945 novel by James Ramsey Ullman. It was the fourth best-selling novel in the US in 1945 and was reprinted as an Armed Services Edition.

It was filmed in 1950 under the direction of Ted Tetzlaff and starred Glenn Ford, Alida Valli, Claude Rains, Lloyd Bridges, Cedric Hardwicke, and Oskar Homolka.

See also

List of bestselling novels in the United States

1945 American novels
American novels adapted into films
J. B. Lippincott & Co. books